David or Dave Harper may refer to:

Arts and entertainment
David Harper (pseudonym), pseudonym of novelist Edwin Corley (1931–1981)
David M. Harper (architect) (born 1953), American architect and design/build entrepreneur
David W. Harper (born 1961), American actor
David Harper (antiques expert) (born 1967), British TV antiques expert and writer
David Harper (General Hospital), fictional character in the soap opera General Hospital

Science and medicine
David M. Harper (zoologist) (born 1950), English zoologist
David Harper (biologist), lecturer in evolutionary biology at the University of Sussex, England
David Harper (palaeontologist), British palaeontologist, professor at Durham University

Sports
Dave Harper (baseball) (1917–1996), American Negro leagues baseball player
Dave Harper (footballer) (1938–2013), English footballer
Dave Harper (American football) (born 1966), American football linebacker in the NFL

Others
David Harper (judge), Australian judge

Other uses
This is David Harper, a television parody show, originally called This is David Lander